William Eugene Stanley Sr. (December 28, 1844 – October 13, 1910) was an American lawyer and the 15th Governor of Kansas.

Biography
Born in Danville, Ohio, Stanley was the son of a physician, reared on a farm, and educated in the common schools of Hardin County, Ohio. He attended Ohio Wesleyan University, but left before he graduated.  He studied in Kenton and Dayton, Ohio, and was admitted to the bar in Kenton, Ohio in 1868. He married Emma Lenora Hills and they had four children.

Arriving in Jefferson County, Kansas, in 1870, Stanley opened his practice and taught school in Perry. He served as county attorney from 1871 to 1872. He resigned that position and moved to Wichita, Kansas. He began practicing law and continued to do so except when in office. He served as Sedgwick County Attorney from 1874 to 1880. Elected to the Kansas House of Representatives, he served from 1881 to 1883.

In 1898, Stanley won the Republican gubernatorial nomination and upon winning the election, he was sworn in on January 9, 1899.  Reelected to a second term, he left office on January 12, 1903.  During his tenure, a US prison revolt at Fort Leavenworth and a 1901 convict strike were dealt with, a traveling library commission was authorized, and the state supreme court was increased to seven judges.

After leaving office, he returned to Wichita and his law practice. From 1903 to 1904, he served on the Dawes Commission to the Five Civilized Tribes.

Stanley died on October 13, 1910, in Wichita, Kansas, and is interred at Highland Cemetery in Wichita.

References

External links

National Governors Association
The Political Graveyard
KSGenWeb
Publications concerning Kansas Governor Stanley's administration available via the KGI Online Library

Republican Party governors of Kansas
1844 births
1910 deaths
People from Danville, Ohio
Methodists from Kansas
19th-century American politicians
Republican Party members of the Kansas House of Representatives